The 2007 European Mixed Curling Championship was held from September 24 to 29, 2007 at the Palacio de Hielo in Madrid, Spain.

Wales, skipped by Adrian Meikle, won its first title, defeating Denmark in the final.

Teams
The teams are as follows:

Round Robin
In every group: two best teams to playoffs.

Group A

 Team to playoffs
 Teams to tie-break for 2nd place

Tie-break

Group B

 Team to playoffs
 Teams to tie-break for 2nd place

Tie-break
Winner of Round 2 to playoffs

Round 1

Round 2

Group C

 Team to playoffs
 Teams to tie-break for 2nd place

Tie-break
Winner of Round 2 to playoffs

Round 1

Round 2

Group D

 Teams to tie-break for 1st place
 Teams to tie-break for 2nd place

Tie-break
For 1st place

For 2nd place

Playoffs

Quarterfinals
September 28, 19:00

Semifinals
September 29, 10:00

Bronze medal game
September 29, 14:00

Final
September 29, 14:00

Final standings

References

 
2007 in curling
2007 in Spanish sport
European Mixed Curling Championship
International curling competitions hosted by Spain
Sports competitions in Madrid
September 2007 sports events in Europe
2007 in Madrid